Ikhwani Hasanuddin (born 7 June 1986) is an Indonesian professional footballer who plays as a full-back.

Career
He started his professional career at PSAP Sigli, when he played for the club in Indonesian Premier League and Indonesian Super League. In 2013, he moved to Gresik United to play in Indonesian Super League. He then signed for Persiraja Banda Aceh to compete in 2016 ISC B and in Liga 2. In 2018, he is playing for the newly-promoted club Aceh United.

Honours

Club
Persiraja Banda Aceh
 Liga 2 Third Place (play-offs): 2019

References

External links
 
 

Living people
Indonesian footballers
1986 births
Association football defenders
Persiraja Banda Aceh players
Sportspeople from Aceh